Jakotina is a village in Central Bosnia, Kotor-Varoš Munuicipality, Bosnia and Herzegovina. In the Census year of 1991, 694 inhabitants lived in Jakotina.

Geography
Jakotina is situated on regional road Kotor-Varoš – Skender Vakuf, abow Jakotina river, left tributary of  Vrbanja river, with elevation of about 490 m. Below the village there is a canyon of the Jakotina river,  and on the opposite riverside there is a destroyed village, Sokoline.

According to the present situation it can be concluded that it is the former village, because it was completely destroyed in the Bosnian War in 1992. In 2013 the village registered only 25 inhabitants, which is less than 4% of the population in 1991 (694).

History
Until 1955, Jakotina belonged to the former Previle Municipality, Kotor Varoš.

A regional church dedicated to Sveti Ilija (Council Elijah the prophet), was built in Jakotina from 1981 to 1984. In 1992, after shelling by (para)military forces of Republika Srpska, it was almost completely destroyed, but the local population was expelled. Rebuilding work began in 2003; the church exterior is now mostly restored. Returning the local population is very slow and difficult. The local Population in Jakotina after war is 0, nobody live in Jakotina! The Serbs destroyed Houses and any Infrastruckture in Jakotina.

Population

See also
Jakotina river
Kotor-Varoš

References

External links

Populated places in Kotor Varoš
Villages in Republika Srpska